The capital of Texas usually refers to Austin, Texas, the capital of the present-day U.S. state. Several other locations served as the capital of Texas prior to statehood:

Pre-Republic
 Monclova, first provincial capital of Texas, 1686, and again in 1833
 Los Adaes (modern day Robeline, Louisiana), 1721 to 1772
 San Antonio, 1772 to 1824 
 San Felipe de Austin, now the San Felipe de Austin State Historic Site, headquarters of the Colony of Texas

Republic of Texas
Washington-on-the-Brazos, Texas, March 1, 1836 to March 17, 1836
Harrisburg, Texas, March 21 to April 1836
Velasco, Texas, April 1836 to September 1836
Columbia, Texas, October 1836, first capital of the elected government of the Republic of Texas
Houston, Texas, 1837 to 1839

Modern-day Texas
Austin, Texas, designated in 1839